Girls in Uniform may refer to:

Mädchen in Uniform, 1931 film
Girls in Uniform (1951 film), a 1951 Mexican drama film
Mädchen in Uniform (1958 film), a 1958 German drama film
"Girls in Uniform", a 1967 episode of Play of the Month
"Girls in Uniform", a song by Beady Eye from BE